Asgar Khanlu may refer to:
 Asgar Khanlu, Ardabil
 Asgar Khanlu, East Azerbaijan